Opesia is a genus of flies in the family Tachinidae.

Species
O. americana (Bigot, 1889)
O. atrata (Coquillett, 1895)
O. cana (Meigen, 1824)
O. descendens Herting, 1973
O. grandis (Egger, 1860)

References

Phasiinae
Diptera of Europe
Diptera of Asia
Diptera of North America
Tachinidae genera
Taxa named by Jean-Baptiste Robineau-Desvoidy
Official Opesia Site